Phidippus otiosus is a species of jumping spider that is found in southeastern North America. It is primarily a tree-living species. Females reach a body length of about 16 mm. Its iridescent chelicerae can range in color from purple to green.

Life cycle
Females position their single egg sac under the bark of oak and pine trees. These are laid from December to February in South Carolina, and from January to June in Florida. The egg sac can hold anywhere from 19-150 eggs, and the spiderlings (slings) will disperse between January and February. The spiderlings mature during fall.

Systematics
Phidippus otiosus is grouped with the closely related species P. californicus, P. pius and P. regius in the otiosus group.

Distribution
Phidippus otiosus naturally occurs in the southeastern United States from Florida and Texas to North Carolina. However, this species is sometimes exported with plants such as Tillandsia, and has been found in countries as remote as Sweden and Germany.

Name
The species name is possibly derived from Latin otium "leisure, peace, quiet" + the suffix -osus "full of, prone to", or from Ancient Greek oto- "ear", referring to the tufts of black hair.

A common name for this species is Canopy Jumping Spider.

Footnotes

References
  (1988): Reproductive Periods of Phidippus Species (Araneae, Salticidae) in South Carolina. Journal of Arachnology 16(1): 95-101. PDF
  (2004): Revision of the jumping spiders of the genus Phidippus (Araneae: Salticidae). Occasional Papers of the Florida State Collection of Arthropoda.
  (2008): The world spider catalog, version 8.5. American Museum of Natural History.

Further reading
  (1980): Taxonomy, ethology, and ecology of Phidippus (Araneae: Salticidae) in eastern North America. Ph.D. dissertation, University of Florida, Gainesville.
  (1996): Metabolic rates of resting salticid and thomisid spiders. Journal of Arachnology 24(2): 129-134. PDF

External links

 Salticidae.org: Photographs
 Salticidae.org: Diagnostic drawings

Salticidae
Fauna of the Southeastern United States
Spiders of the United States
Spiders described in 1846
Taxa named by Nicholas Marcellus Hentz